Energy and Buildings is a peer-reviewed, scientific journal that covers the energy use in buildings and their impact on the environment. The journal is published by Elsevier and was established in 1979. The Editor-in-Chief is Jianlei Niu.

The journal covers a wide range of topics related to the use of energy in buildings, including the design, construction, operation, and maintenance of buildings, as well as the development of new technologies and methodologies for reducing energy use and improving energy efficiency. The scope of the journal includes the following areas: building physics, building energy systems, building automation, energy-efficient design, renewable energy systems, and energy policy. Energy and Buildings features original research articles, review articles, and short communications.

Abstracting and indexing 
The journal is abstracted and indexed for example in:

 Scopus
 Web of Science

According to the Journal Citation Reports, the journal has a 2021 impact factor of 7.201.

References

External links 

Energy
English-language journals
Elsevier academic journals